Caterair was the name of a Texas-based investment, Caterair International, Inc., of the private equity firm Carlyle Group.  It provided in-flight meals for passengers on large commuter aircraft.  It is famous for its association with George W. Bush, who was a member of its board of directors between 1990 and 1994, and even served on its audit committee.  He quit the Board to run for the position of Texas governor, months before the firm declared bankruptcy.

Carlyle acquired the business from Marriott Corp. which sold its In-Flite Services catering business to Marriott’s upper management.  Carlyle took a 50% stake, committing $93.8 million.  The business was renamed Caterair.  The investment was funded primarily by a massive issuance of junk bond financing, as was the trend at that time.

With the global economy spiralling into recession during the early 1990s, the airline business faltered, and with it did Caterair.  It eventually defaulted on its debt obligations during 1994.  Hence, it was later dubbed CraterAir, by Wall Street analysts.

Caterair was sold by Carlyle to the Canadian private equity firm, Onex Corporation, in September 1995 which merged it with its other acquisition LSG/Sky Chef.

Quotes
 David Rubenstein (a founder of the Carlyle Group) described that time to a convention of pension managers in Los Angeles last year, recalling that Republican fund raiser, Fred Malek approached him and said, "There is a guy who would like to be on the board. He's kind of down on his luck a bit. Needs a job. . . . Needs some board positions." Though Rubenstein didn't think George W. Bush, then in his mid-40s, "added much value," he put him on the Caterair board. "Came to all the meetings," Rubenstein told the conventioneers. "Told a lot of jokes. Not that many clean ones. And after a while I kind of said to him, after about three years: You know, I'm not sure this is really for you. Maybe you should do something else. Because I don't think you're adding that much value to the board. You don't know that much about the company."  He said: "Well, I think I'm getting out of this business anyway. And I don't really like it that much. So I'm probably going to resign from the board." And I said "thanks". Didn't think I'd ever see him again.' - The New York Times, Ron Suskind, Without A Doubt, 17 October 2004, his uncited original source being Progressive Review, Suzan Mazur, "How Bush Got Bounced From Carlyle Board", 1 July 2003.

References

Airline catering
George W. Bush
The Carlyle Group companies